HD 27245, also known as HR 1335 or rarely 25 H. Camelopardalis is a solitary red-hued star located in the northern circumpolar constellation Camelopardalis. It has an apparent magnitude of 5.4, making it faintly visible to the naked eye. At its current distance, HD 27245's brightness is diminished by 0.36 magnitudes due to extinction from interstellar dust. It has an absolute magnitude of −0.27.

HD 27245 is an aging red giant with a stellar classification of M0 III. HD 27245's iron abundance is 129% that of the Sun's, making it metal enriched.

HD 27245 is a suspected variable star with an amplitude of 0.05 magnitudes. Its variability was first observed in 1930 by Joel Stebbins. However, Eggen (1967) instead lists it as an ordinary M-type giant and used the object for comparison. In 1978-9, HD 28245 was again listed as a variable star but did not provide further insight.  As of 2017, the star has not been confirmed to be variable.

References

External links
 HR 1335
 Image HD 27245

Camelopardalis (constellation)
027245
020376
M-type giants
1335
Suspected variables
BD+60 00800